Social movements are groupings of individuals or organizations which focus on political or social issues.

This list excludes the following:
 Artistic movements: see list of art movements.
 Independence movements: see lists of active separatist movements and list of historical separatist movements
 Revolutionary movements: see List of revolutions and rebellions
 Religious and spiritual movements: see List of religions and spiritual traditions and List of new religious movements

List

 9/11 Truth movement
 Abolitionist movement
 ACT UP
 Alternative movement
 Animal Rebellion
 Anti-Apartheid Movement
 Anti-capitalism
 Anti-consumerism
 Anti-corporate activism
 Anti-Extradition Law Amendment Bill Movement
 Anti-fascism
 Anti-globalization movement
 Anti-jock movement
 Anti-liberalism
 Anti-nuclear movement
 Anti-psychiatry movement 
 Anti-war movement
 Anti-work movement
 Anti-vaccination movement
 Alt-right
 Asian American movement
 Autism rights movement movement advocating for the right of people who are considered neurally divergent (anti-psychiatry)
 Black Consciousness Movement
 Black Lives Matter
 Black Power movement
 Boycott, Divestment, and Sanctions
 Brights movement
 Chicano Movement
 Children's rights movement
 Civil rights movement
 Climate movement
 Conservation movement
 Counterculture movement
 Cooperative movement 
 Cultural movement
 Decolonization
 Disability rights movement
 Earth First!
 Ecofeminism
 Ecomasculinity
 Economy for the Common Good
 Effective altruism
 Efficiency movement
 Environmental justice movement
 Environmental movement
 Esperanto movement
 Ethiopian movement
 Extinction Rebellion
 Fair trade movement
 Farm-to-table movement
 Farm Worker Movement
 Feminist movement
 Free culture movement
 Free love
 Free school movement
 Free software movement
 LGBT social movements
 Gerakan Harapan Baru (New Hope Movement in Malaysia)
 Global citizens movement
 Global justice movement
 Health at Every Size
 Health freedom movement
 Hippie movement
 Hizmet movement
 Human rights movement
 Identitarian movement
 Immigrant rights movement
 India Against Corruption
 Indigenous peoples movement
 Indigenous movements in the Americas
 2017 pro-jallikattu protests
 Labor movement
 Landless Peoples Movement (South Africa)
 Landless Workers' Movement  (MST), the landless workers' movement in Brasil
 Lawyers' Movement in Pakistan
 Lebensreform
 LGBT rights opposition
 LGBTQ social movements (lesbian, gay, bisexual, and transgender social movements)
 Mad Pride (psychiatric social movement)
 March For Our Lives movement
 Men's rights movement
 Me Too movement
 Mothers Against Drunk Driving
 Multiculturalism
 Namantar Andolan (Change Movement among Dalits in India)
 Narmada Bachao Andolan
 National Cleanup Day
 Non-cooperation movement
 Nonviolence movement
 Occupy movement
 Occupy Wall Street
 Organic movement
 Plogging
 Popular Assembly of the Peoples of Oaxaca
 Pro-choice movement
 Pro-life movement
 Psychiatric survivors movement
Psilocybin decriminalization in the United States
 QAnon

 Rape crisis movement
 Rastafari movement
 Reform movements in the United States
 Reproductive justice
 Right to health
 Right to life
 Rural People's Movement
 Scouting Movement
 Salt March (Salt Satyagraha movement)
 Skeptical movement
 Sex-positive movement
 Sex Workers' Rights Movement
 Slow Food movement
 Slow movement
 Situationist International
 Social democracy
 South African Unemployed Peoples' Movement
 Soviet Jewry Movement
 Student movement
 Sunrise Movement
 Tea Party movement
 Temperance movement
 The Bees Army
 The Zeitgeist Movement

 Time to Change
 Time's Up (movement)
 Treatment Action Campaign - movement struggling for HIV/AIDS treatment in South Africa
 Umbrella Movement
 Veganism
 Via Campesina - international peasants movement representing 150 million people, advocating food sovereignty.
 Voluntary Human Extinction Movement
 White Wednesdays
 Western Cape Anti-Eviction Campaign South African movement struggling against evictions
 White Power Movement 
 Wikimedia movement
 Women Against War
 Woman's Exchange Movement
 Women's liberation movement
 Women's suffrage

External links
 ASA section on Collective Behavior and Social Movements
 Mobilization journal
 Research in Social Movements, Conflicts and Changejournal
 Social Movement Studies: Journal of Social, Cultural and Political Protest
 Interface: a Journal For and About Social Movements
 Social Movements: A Summary of What Works (pdf)

 Social movements
Social change